Brett Reichman is a painter and Professor at the San Francisco Art Institute where he teaches in both the graduate and undergraduate programs. Born in Pittsburgh, Pennsylvania, he has lived and worked in San Francisco since 1984.

His work came to fruition in the late 1980s out of cultural activism that addressed the AIDS epidemic and gay identity politics and was curated into early exhibitions that acknowledged those formative issues. These exhibitions included Situation: Perspectives on Work by Lesbian and Gay Artists at New Langton Arts in San Francisco, The Anti-Masculine at the Kim Light Gallery in Los Angeles, Beyond Loss at the Washington Project for the Arts in Washington, D.C, and In A Different Light: Visual Culture, Sexual Identity, Queer Practice at the Berkeley Art Museum, Berkeley, California. However, after legislation passed in 1989 that restricted federal funding for art dealing with homosexuality and AIDS, artists like Reichman approached their themes subtly. His And the Spell Was Broken Somewhere Over the Rainbow is embellished with colors of the rainbow and presents three clocks. It references Oz while actually indirectly addressing the new reality that San Francisco could no longer be viewed as a land of enchantment due to the AIDS crisis.

Style and theme 
Reichman's inquiry into the politics of gay culture critiques political correctness and cultural assimilation, but the approach to realism is never simply reproductive. He separates the concept of Realism from Naturalism within a discourse that views popular culture as anxious, obsessed with artificiality and unnatural beauty. His pictures take lubricious fantasy to the point of ridicule, without losing completely a quotient of psychological truth. Often, his works include what he collects: mid-century modern furniture and dinnerware. The aesthetics of these mid-century items are often present in his representations of non-normative contemporary gay domestic space. An example of Reichman's own mid-century design object he has incorporated into his artwork is the Gildcraft Italia Mondrian Vase, which he uses as the title for his painting. The works in his show at CB1 Gallery, Better Living Through Design, are titled after his mid-century furniture and set pieces.

Reichman being gay in the age of AIDS drew him to expose social perceptions and prejudices which also allowed him to express his own sense of self. The AIDS era drew his consciousness to loss—the loss of life as well as of innocence and the sense of freedom that once prevailed in the gay community. In Reichman's early works, he uses children's toys such as rubber lambs and pixies to provide a source of imagined innocence. He also plays around with childhood fables that make viewers perceive cheerful expectations or enthusiasms. Yet, his decisive details with this theme suggest that some things are not always what they seem. His early works focused on being about a certain loss of cultural innocence. Reichman's 1998 show, It's Hard to Be Happy, at the Orange County Museum of Art, reveals his fascination with duality and misleading appearances. In his work Threefold, Reichman depicts three elves, with the look of worry on one elf's face, in contrast to the others' obliviousness, suggesting the awareness and threat of AIDS.

Technique 
Oil paintings address the history of fabric and folds in painting while situating this rich history within a contemporary discourse of exaggeration, camp, and queer politic. Reichman has evidently noticed how frequently in pre-modern European painting the coursing of posh clothing and other drapery can communicate the unutterable and unpicturable - the very scandal of embodiment itself - to the suggestible mind.

Works on paper are accomplished in watercolor and gouache through the process of layered crosshatching. The crosshatch ironically builds up the image while simultaneously negating it. This opposition refers to the contradictions within the imagery itself: representative of satisfaction and dissatisfaction, fulfillment and insatiability, humor and disgust. The crosshatch creates an image stroke by stroke, further implicating the subtexts of obsessiveness, eroticism, and the hard-fought, hard won achievements exemplified through personal and political struggle.

Exhibitions 
Reichman has been the subject of numerous solo exhibitions at Gallery Paule Anglim in San Francisco, the PPOW Gallery in New York, Feature Inc., New York, the Rena Bransten Gallery in San Francisco, and the Orange County Museum of Art. His work was recently included in the national touring exhibition Art AIDS America, I Am Not Monogamous, I Heart Poetry, at Feature, Inc. New York, Silence, Exile and Cunning at the Sonoma Valley Museum of Art, Kiki: The Proof Is In The Pudding at Ratio 3 Gallery in San Francisco, and Pacific Light: A Survey of California Watercolor 1908-2008, at the Nordic Watercolor Museum (Nordiska Akvarellmuseet), Skärhamn, Sweden.

Reichman's work is in many public collections, including the San Francisco Museum of Modern Art, the Berkeley Art Museum, the Portland Art Museum, and the Orange County Museum.

His work is featured in the publications Art—A Sex Book by John Waters and Bruce Hainley, Untitled Publication (Red Square), by Feature Inc, Pacific Light: A Survey of California Watercolor 1908-2008, the Nordiska Akvarellmuseet and In A Different Light: Visual Culture, Sexual Identity, Queer Practice, Art, AIDS, America,'' among others.

Awards and grants 

 2012 San Francisco Art Institute, Morgan Library, NY, NY, Faculty Development Grant 
 2005 San Francisco Art Institute, Faculty Development Grant 
 2001 San Francisco Art Institute, Faculty Development Grant 
 1999 Artadia Award
 1999 Art Council Grant, San Francisco, CA

References

Selected bibliography
Baker, Kenneth, “Reichman and Sherwood at Anglim”,  San Francisco Chronicle,  September 11, 2010, page E3
Baker, Kenneth, “ Reichman and Beech at Paule Anglim”  San Francisco Chronicle, April 22, 2006, page E 10
Little, Carl, “Brett Reichman at PPOW”, Art In America, January 2006, pp121–122
Curtis, Cathy, "Art Reviews: " Pieces of Theater in Light, Shadow," Los Angeles Times, July 14, 1998,  p.F3K
Porges, Maria, "Reviews: Brett Reichman, Rena Bransten Gallery," Artforum, September 1997, XXXVI, No. 1, p. 130
Duncan, Michael, "Queering the Discourse," Art in America, July, 1995,  pp. 27–31
Galloway, Munro, "Manifest Disney: I'Eden Selon Disney:  Culture Pop et Peinture," Art Press (special issue on painting), 1995, pp. 163–166
Bonetti, David, "Childlike Show Reveals Artist's Hidden Elf," San Francisco Examiner, November 29, 1991

External links
Brett Reichman
Paule Anglim Gallery
CB1 Gallery

Year of birth missing (living people)
Living people
Artists from Pittsburgh
20th-century American painters
American male painters
21st-century American painters
San Francisco Art Institute faculty
20th-century American male artists